Ravens & Lullabies is a studio album by Gordon Giltrap and Oliver Wakeman.

Giltrap also worked with Oliver's father Rick Wakeman on the album From Brush and Stone three years prior.

Track listing

Personnel 
Oliver Wakeman - piano, keyboards and backing vocals
Gordon Giltrap - acoustic and electric guitars
Paul Manzi - vocals
Benoît David - vocals
Steve Amadeo - bass guitar
Johanne James - drums and percussion

References 

2013 albums
Gordon Giltrap albums